The women's 400 metres hurdles at the 2003 All-Africa Games were held on October 14.

Results

Final

References

400